Sir Nicholas Martyn (12 April 1593 – 25 March 1653) was an English politician who sat in the House of Commons from 1646 to 1648.

Martyn was the son of Sir William Martyn and his wife Susan Prestwood, of Exeter. He was educated at Broadgates Hall, Oxford matriculating on 8 March 1611, at the age of 17. He became a student of the Middle Temple in 1613. He was knighted by King James I at his Court at Newmarket on 12 February 1624. He was landowner of Oxton and Kenton and in November 1639 he became High Sheriff of Devon.

In 1641, in a year of plots and treasons, Martyn was proclaimed a traitor by the king, and he was excepted from the offer of a general pardon together with Sir George Chudleigh, Sir John Northcote, and Sir Samuel Rolle. He was included in an order clearing proclaimed persons issued on 7 December 1642. In June 1646, he was elected Member of Parliament for Devon in the Long Parliament.

Martyn died at Netherex at the age of 59. It is said that before he died, as he lay sick at his house, one of the bells of the church began to toll of its own accord and continued for about a quarter of an hour until the time of his death. A monument was erected in Kenton church.

Martyn married Elizabeth Symes, of Pounsford, Somerset. His daughter, who married a wollen draper of Watling Street in the city, provided sanctuary for the five members that King Charles tried to arrest in the House of Commons.

References

1593 births
1653 deaths
English MPs 1640–1648
Alumni of Pembroke College, Oxford
Members of the Middle Temple
High Sheriffs of Devon
Members of the Parliament of England (pre-1707) for Devon